Michael van den Berg (born 2 April 1968) is a Dutch tennis coach and former professional player. He has worked as a coach with several players including Amanda Hopmans and Claudine Schaul.

Active on tour in the early 1990s, van den Berg reached a career high singles world ranking of 368. He featured in the qualifying draw for the 1992 Wimbledon Championships and was unable to progress, but did win a match against Daniel Nestor. Competing on doubles, he had an ATP Tour main draw appearance in 1992 at Hilversum and also won that year's Segovia Challenger tournament, partnering Joost Wijnhoud in both.

ATP Challenger titles

Doubles: (1)

References

External links
 
 

1968 births
Living people
Dutch male tennis players
Dutch tennis coaches